The National Hurling League is an annual inter-county hurling competition featuring teams from Ireland and England. Founded in 1925 by the Gaelic Athletic Association, it operates on a system of promotion and relegation within the league system.

The league has 35 teams divided into six divisions, with either five or six teams in each division. Promotion and relegation between these divisions is a central feature of the league. Although primarily a competition for Irish teams, teams from England – currently Lancashire, London and Warwickshire – also take part, while in the past New York also fielded a team for the latter stages of the league. Teams representing subdivisions of counties, such as Fingal and South Down have also participated at various times.

The National Hurling League has been associated with a title sponsor since 1985. Ford, Royal Liver and Church & General have all served as sponsors of the league since then. The competition is currently sponsored by Allianz and is officially known as the Allianz Hurling League.

The league season runs from January to March with each team in the group playing each other once. Division 1 of the league features the top twelve hurling teams split into two divisions of six. A knock-out stage follows for the four top-placed teams in each division. The winners of the Division 1 title are awarded the Dr Croke Cup and are officially regarded as the National Hurling League champions.

The National Hurling League title has been won by 10 different teams, 9 of whom have won the title more than once. The all-time record-holders are Tipperary and Kilkenny, who have won the league on 19 occasions. Waterford won the 2022 title.

History

Creation

Since 1887, the All-Ireland Championship had been steadily growing in interest and in participation. The championship, however, was largely confined to the summer months, resulting in a lack of top class inter-county action between September and April. Inter-county tournament games were popular as a way of filling the void, while some provinces organised their own pre-championship competitions, most notably the Thomond Feis in Munster. Several counties had also organised inter-club leagues as a means of supplementing the county championship by providing more games. While these had proved successful, it was decided to create a national senior inter-county league to provide games during the winter and spring months.

Beginnings

The inaugural National Hurling League began on 27 September 1925 and ended on 16 May 1926. Seven teams - Cork, Dublin, Galway. Kilkenny, Laois, Limerick and Tipperary - competed in a six-game single round-robin format. At the end of the group stage the top two teams contested the league final. Cork won the 1925–26 league following a 3–7 to 1–5 defeat of Dublin in the final.

Development

While no league took place during the 1926–27 season, the 1926–27 league featured nine teams. A single round-robin format was once again used, with each team playing eight games. The second league featured no final, with Tipperary being declared champions after securing 14 points from their group stage games.

The 1928-29 league featured twelve teams divided in two groups based on geographical position. The Eastern Division comprised five teams from the province of Leinster, while the Southwestern Division had seven teams from the province of Munster and Galway. The top teams in each division played off in the final to determine the champions. This format was used on a number of occasions until the 1934–35, when the league reverted to a straightforward one-group league with the top-placed team being declared the champions. This format was used again during the leagues in 1935–36 and 1936–37.

Ten teams entered the 1937–38 league, with two groups of five teams competing.  A third group was added in 1938–39 as the number of teams increased to thirteen. These formats were regularly used over the following seasons, depending on the number of teams participating.

Between 1941 and 1945 the league was suspended due to the Emergency.

The 1955–56 league saw the introduction of a major change in format. As a result of a lack of interest from defeated first-round teams in recent years, Central Council introduced a two-division league featuring a new system of relegation and promotion. Division 1 was confined to ten teams in two groups of five. The bottom-placed team in each group would play off to decide which of the two teams would be relegated. Division 2 was made up of the 'second tier' hurling teams and featured eight teams divided into two groups. Limerick became the first team to be relegated, while Antrim became the first team to gain promotion under the new system.

Schedule
In the 20th century, National League fixtures were played during inter-county windows in the later and early months of the calendar year, while the SHC occupied the inter-county window during those months that made up the middle of the year, e.g. May, August. Club competitions of lesser importance occurred alongside the inter-county games so as to provide meaningful game time for players possessed of insufficient ability to compete at the higher (inter-county) level.

From 1997, National League fixtures were played during the early months of the calendar year, preceding the SHC, which remained in the traditional mid-year position. An April club window allowed inter-county players to return to their clubs to participate in some early rounds of the more important club competitions, i.e. championship fixtures.

This arrangement was disrupted during the COVID-19 pandemic. Due to the impact of the pandemic on Gaelic games, the 2020 National League was suspended in March and all Gaelic games ceased until the middle of the year, when club fixtures were first to resume. The National League was then completed in October, ahead of the All-Ireland Senior Hurling Championship (which was completed in December). This led to a motion (passed at the 2021 GAA Congress) to adopt a "split season" model, whereby club competitions would occupy one part of the calendar year and inter-county fixtures the other part.

Sponsorship
Since 1985, the National Hurling League has been sponsored. The sponsor has usually been able to determine the league's sponsorship name.

Division 1

History

Division 1 has existed in its current form since the 2012 league. Prior to this, Division 1 had existed as a single division of eight teams. The new division, comprising two groups, was created using the final rankings from the 2011 league. The top six teams from that year's Division 1 were added to the new Division 1A. The bottom two teams from Division 1 and the top four teams from Division 2 were added to the new Division 1B.

In 2012 and 2013, the top two teams in Division 1B contested a final, with the winners joining the top three teams from Division 1A in the semi-finals of the league proper. This format was abandoned when the quarter-final stage was introduced during the 2014 league.

Format

There are currently twelve teams in Division 1, however, these teams are subdivided into two groups of six - teams ranked one to six in Division 1A and teams ranked seven to twelve in Division 1B.

During the course of a season (from January to March) each team plays the others once (a single round-robin system) for a total of 15 games in each group. Teams receive two points for a win and one point for a draw. No points are awarded for a loss. Where two teams are level on points, the team that wins the head-to-head match is ranked ahead. If this game is a draw, points difference (total scored minus total conceded in all games) is used to rank the teams. Where three or more teams are level on points, points difference is used to rank them.

At the top end of the group stage competition in Divisions 1A and 1B there is a knock-out section featuring quarter-finals, semi-finals and a final. The top four teams in both Division 1A and 1B qualify for the league quarter-finals, with the top team in 1A playing the fourth team in 1B, the second team in 1A playing the third in 1B and so on. It is therefore possible for a team finishing fourth in Division 1B (8th position overall) to be eventual National Hurling League champions.

The quarter-finals and semi-finals finish on the day the games are played, thus avoiding the need for replays. If the score is level after the initial seventy minutes, still level after two ten minute periods of extra time played each way, and still level after a further two five minute periods of extra time, a free-taking competition is held. Each team nominates five players to take frees from their chosen position on the 65-metre line. If the teams score an equal number of the five frees, the outcome of the match is decided by sudden death frees using the same nominated players in the same order.

The bottom two teams in Division 1A contest a relegation playoff, with the losing team being relegated to Division 1B the following season. They effectively swap places with the top team in Division 1B, who gain automatic promotion to the top tier.

The bottom two teams in Division 1B also contest a relegation playoff, with the losing team being relegated to Division 2A the following season. Their place in the division is then taken by the Division 2A champions, who gain automatic promotion.

Teams

Division 1A

The following six teams are competing in Division 1A during the 2019 league.

Division 1B

The following six teams are competing in Division 1B during the 2019 league.

Venues

Attendances

Stadium attendances are a significant source of regular income for Central Council and for the teams involved. For the knock-out stages of the 2017 league, average attendances were 12,474 with a total aggregate attendance figure of 87,321 for the seven games.

Group stage

The league is operated using a home and away basis every second year. Fixtures in the five group stage rounds of the league are played at the home ground of one of the two teams involved. Each team is guaranteed at least two home games.

Quarter-finals

The quarter-finals of the league are usually played at the home venue of one of the teams involved. The team which receives home advantage is decided by using the home and away agreement or by a coin toss.

Semi-finals

The semi-finals of the league are usually played on the same day at the same venue as part of a double-header of games. Semple Stadium, Nowlan Park and the Gaelic Grounds have all been used as the venues for the semi-finals.

Final

Since 2000, Semple Stadium has been used on ten occasions as the host venue for the league final. The Gaelic Grounds, Nowlan Park and Croke Park have also been used as the final venue during this time.

Managers

Managers in the National Hurling League are involved in the day-to-day running of the team, including the training, team selection, and sourcing of players from the club championships. Their influence varies from county-to-county and is related to the individual county boards. From 2018, all inter-county head coaches must be Award 2 qualified. The manager is assisted by a team of two or three selectors and an extensive backroom team consisting of various coaches. Prior to the development of the concept of a manager in the 1970s, teams were usually managed by a team of selectors with one member acting as chairman.

Notes

General performance

By county

By province

List of finals

Records and statistics

By decade
The most successful team of each decade, judged by number of National Hurling League titles, is as follows:

 1920s: 1 each for Cork (1926), Tipperary (1928) and Dublin (1929)
 1930s: 5 for Limerick (1934-35-36-37-38)
 1940s: 3 for Cork (1940-41-48)
 1950s: 6 for Tipperary (1950-52-54-55-57-59)
 1960s: 5 for Tipperary (1960-61-64-65-68)
 1970s: 3 for Cork (1970-72-74)
 1980s: 3 for Kilkenny (1982-83-86)
 1990s: 2 each for Kilkenny (1990–95), Limerick (1992–97), Cork (1993–98) and Tipperary (1994–99)
 2000s: 5 for Kilkenny (2002-03-05-06-09)
 2010s: 4 for Kilkenny (2012-13-14-18)

Gaps

Top ten longest gaps between successive league titles:
 72 years: Dublin (1939-2011)
 44 years: Waterford (1963-2007)
 38 years: Clare (1978-2016)
 31 years: Clare (1946-1977)
 29 years: Kilkenny (1933-1962)
 24 years: Cork (1999–present)
 24 years: Galway (1951-1975)
 24 years: Limerick (1947-1971)
 22 years: Limerick (1997-2019)
 21 years: Tipperary (1928-1949)

Division 2A

History

Division 2A has existed in its current form since the 2012 league. Prior to this, Division 2 had existed as a single division of eight teams. The new division was created using the final rankings from the 2011 league. The bottom four teams from that year's Division 2 and the top two teams from Division 3A were added to the new Division 2A.

Format

There are currently six teams in Division 2A.

During the course of a season (from January to March) each team plays the others once (a single round-robin system) for a total of 15 games. Teams receive two points for a win and one point for a draw. No points are awarded for a loss. Where two teams are level on points, the team that wins the head-to-head match is ranked ahead. If this game is a draw, points difference (total scored minus total conceded in all games) is used to rank the teams. Where three or more teams are level on points, points difference is used to rank them.

The top two teams in Division 2A contest the final.

The bottom two teams in Division 2A contest a relegation playoff, with the losing team being relegated to Division 2B the following season. Their place in the division is then taken by the Division 2B champions, who gain automatic promotion.

Teams

The following six teams are competing in Division 2A during the 2023 league.

General performance

List of finals

Roll of honour

Relegated teams

Division 2B

History

Division 2B has existed in its current form since the 2012 league. Prior to this, Division 2 had existed as a single division of eight teams. The new division was created using the final rankings from the 2011 league. The bottom four teams from that year's Division 3A and the top two teams from Division 3B were added to the new Division 2B.

Format

There are currently six teams in Division 2B.

During the course of a season (from January to March) each team plays the others once (a single round-robin system) for a total of 15 games. Teams receive two points for a win and one point for a draw. No points are awarded for a loss. Where two teams are level on points, the team that wins the head-to-head match is ranked ahead. If this game is a draw, points difference (total scored minus total conceded in all games) is used to rank the teams. Where three or more teams are level on points, points difference is used to rank them.

The top two teams in Division 2B contest the final.

The bottom two teams in Division 2B contest a relegation playoff, with the losing team being relegated to Division 3A the following season. Their place in the division is then taken by the Division 3A champions, who gain automatic promotion.

Teams

The following six teams are competing in Division 2B during the 2023 league.

General performance

List of finals

Relegated teams

Division 3A

History

Division 3A has existed in its current form since 2012, however, it has existed as a division in its own right since the 2009 league. Prior to this, Division 3 had existed as a single division of five teams. The new division was created using the final rankings from the 2008 league. The third, fourth and fifth ranked teams from that year's Division 2A and 2B were added to the new Division 3A.

Format

There are currently six teams in Division 3A.

During the course of a season (from January to March) each team plays the others once (a single round-robin system) for a total of 15 games. Teams receive two points for a win and one point for a draw. No points are awarded for a loss. Where two teams are level on points, the team that wins the head-to-head match is ranked ahead. If this game is a draw, points difference (total scored minus total conceded in all games) is used to rank the teams. Where three or more teams are level on points, points difference is used to rank them.

The top two teams in Division 3A contest the final.

The bottom two teams in Division 3A contest a relegation playoff, with the losing team being relegated to Division 3B the following season. Their place in the division is then taken by the Division 3B champions, who gain automatic promotion.

Teams

The following six teams are competing in Division 3A during the 2018 league.

General performance

List of finals

Relegated teams

Division 3B

History

Division 3B has existed in its current form since 2012, however, it has existed as a division in its own right since the 2009 league. Prior to this, Division 3 had existed as a single division of five teams. The new division was created using the final rankings from the 2008 league. The two bottom-placed teams from that year's Division 2A and 2B and the remaining four Division 3 teams were added to the new Division 3A. Fingal were added to the division as a seventh team.

A restructuring of the entire league system in 2012 saw Division 3B reduced to four teams. It was now the bottom league of the entire National Hurling League. The number of participating teams increased to five during the 2016 league.

Format

There are currently five teams in Division 3B.

During the course of a season (from January to March) each team plays the others once (a single round-robin system) for a total of 10 games. Teams receive two points for a win and one point for a draw. No points are awarded for a loss. Where two teams are level on points, the team that wins the head-to-head match is ranked ahead. If this game is a draw, points difference (total scored minus total conceded in all games) is used to rank the teams. Where three or more teams are level on points, points difference is used to rank them.

The top two teams in Division 3B contest the final.

Teams

The following six teams are competing in Division 3A during the 2018 league.

General performance

List of finals

Former divisions

Division 1B

Division 2

Division 3

Division 3 Shield

Division 4

Players with most league wins

Broadcasting rights
Setanta Sports broadcasts live matches in Australia. Setanta Sports also provides matches from the National Hurling League in Asia. In Ireland TG4 shows live matches each week on Sunday afternoon, with deferred coverage of a second match shown straight after. Setanta Sports broadcasts matches live on the Saturday evening slot. Highlights for all the games are shown at 7:00pm on League Sunday on RTÉ2.

See also
List of National Hurling League winning teams
National Camogie League

References

External links

 NHL Results and Fixtures
 Semi-final and final results 1926-2005

 
1
!
1925 establishments in Ireland
Hurling